The Information Technology functional constituency was a functional constituency in the elections for the Legislative Council of Hong Kong until it was replaced by Technology and Innovation functional constituency with a much narrower electorate in the 2021 electoral overhaul.

Since its creation in 1998, it has been normally held by the pro-democracy camp, with the interruption from 2008 to 2012, where the seat was held by pro-Beijing Samson Tam who defeated pro-democracy candidate Charles Mok by 35 votes with the help of the Internet Professional Association (iProA), a pro-Beijing IT association. In 2012, Mok retook the seat for the pro-democrats from the pro-Beijing camp by defeating Tam. Mok resigned effective 1 December 2020 as part of the 2020 LegCo mass resignations in protest of the disqualification of four pro-democracy legislators.

Composition
The Information Technology constituency was composed of individuals who are members of relevant associations such as the Hong Kong Computer Society, and Institute of Electrical and Electronics Engineers and corporate members of organisations such as the Hong Kong Information Technology Federation, Hong Kong Wireless Technology Industry and Society of Hong Kong External Telecommunications Services Providers who are entitled to vote at general meetings, as well as some other corporations with certain licences granted by the Telecommunication Authority.

Since 1998, there have been a number of additional associations included in the electorate. In 2006, there were four organisations where individual members were qualified as electorates although they were not allowed to vote in the general meetings, such as the Professional Information Security Association and the Hong Kong and Mainland Software Industry Corporation Association. Since 2003, members of the pro-Beijing Internet Professional Association (iProA) are also eligible to vote in the constituency, which helped its pro-Beijing member Samson Tam to take the seat from pro-democrats' hand in the 2008 Legislative Council election.

In 2006, there were 4,743 individuals (94.9% of the electorate) and 261 registered corporations (4.1% of the electorate). In 2016, it saw an 80% surge in the number of registered voters, from 6,716 in 2012 to 12,046 in 2016, according to provisional voter statistics released by the Registration and Electoral Office. Incumbent legislator Charles Mok questioned whether pro-Beijing forces were getting people to sign up.

In April 2017, the Independent Commission Against Corruption arrested 72 people over alleged vote-rigging, 68 of them were newly registered electors and four were middlemen, three of whom were registered voters. A source identified them as the members of the Internet Professional Association (iProA) and the Institute of Electrical and Electronics Engineers (IEEE), Hong Kong section, computer chapter.

Returned members

Electoral results

2010s

2000s

1990s

References

Constituencies of Hong Kong
Constituencies of Hong Kong Legislative Council
Functional constituencies (Hong Kong)
1998 establishments in Hong Kong
Constituencies established in 1998
2021 disestablishments in Hong Kong
Constituencies disestablished in 2021